Pine Creek is a stream in the U.S. state of Nevada. It is a tributary to the Humboldt River.

Pine Creek was so named on account of pine timber near its course.

References

Rivers of Elko County, Nevada
Rivers of Eureka County, Nevada
Rivers of Nevada